A compressor station is a facility which helps the transportation process of natural gas from one location to another. Siting is dependent on terrain, and the number of gas wells in the vicinity. Frequent elevation changes and a greater number of gas wells will require more compressor stations.

The compressor station, also called a pumping station, is the "engine" that powers a long-distance natural gas pipeline.  As the name implies, the station compresses the gas (increasing its pressure) thereby providing energy to move it through the pipeline. The compressor is driven by a motor fueled by some of the natural gas bled from the pipeline.

Pipeline companies install compressor stations along a pipeline route.  The size of the station and the number of compressors (pumps) varies, based on the diameter of the pipe and the volume of gas to be moved.  Nevertheless, the basic components of a station are similar.

Liquid Separators

As the pipeline enters the compressor station the natural gas passes through scrubbers, strainers or filter separators. These are vessels designed to remove any free liquids or dirt particles from the gas before it enters the compressors. Though the pipeline is carrying “dry gas,” some water and hydrocarbon liquids may condense out of the gas stream as the gas cools and moves through the pipeline.
 
Any liquids that may be produced are collected and stored for sale or disposal.  A piping system directs the gas from the separators to the gas compressor for compression.

Prime Movers 

There are three commonly used types of engines that drive the compressors and are known as "prime movers":

 Turbine / Centrifugal Compressor uses a natural gas-fired turbine to turn a centrifugal compressor.  The centrifugal compressor is similar to a large fan inside a case, which pumps the gas as the fan turns.  A small portion of natural gas from the pipeline is burned to power the turbine.
 Electric Motor/Centrifugal Compressor uses a centrifugal compressor driven by a high voltage electric motor.  An electrified compressor may still require an air permit, as regulations vary by state an applicability analysis should be conducted whenever a compressor station will be constructed.  A highly reliable source of electric power must be available and near the station.
 Reciprocating Engine/Reciprocating Compressor uses a large piston engine resembling an automobile engine, only much larger.  Commonly known as “,” these engines are fueled by natural gas from the pipeline.  Reciprocating pistons, located in cylinder cases on the side of the unit, compress the natural gas.  The compressor pistons and the power pistons are connected to a common crankshaft.  The advantage of reciprocating compressors is that the volume of gas pushed through the pipeline can be adjusted incrementally to meet small changes in customer demand.

See also 

 Gas compressor
 Centrifugal fan
 Gas compression heat pump

References

Natural gas infrastructure
Natural gas technology